The Schaudinnellidae are a family of parasitic alveolates in the phylum Apicomplexa.

Taxonomy

There is one genus in this family - Schaudinnella.

The type species in this genus is Schaudinnella henleae.

History

This family was created by Poche in 1913.

Description

References

Apicomplexa families